Peace Bell refers to: 
Japanese Peace Bell at the United Nations Headquarters in New York, New York, USA and more than twenty copies of it in other places around the world
World Peace Bell in Newport, Kentucky, USA
 Peace Bell at Imjingak Park, South Korea